Guan (c. 1046–1040 BC) was an ancient Chinese city-state in present-day Henan. Its capital was Guancheng or Guan City in present-day Guancheng Hui District of Zhengzhou and its power was limited to the immediate surrounding area.

Guan was established soon after the founding of the Zhou dynasty as an appanage for King Wu's younger brother, who was known as Guan Shu Xian. The three brothers Guan Shu Xian, Huo Shu Chu, and Cai Shu Du were known as the Three Guards, for their territories' function protecting the Zhou homeland. Following the death of King Wu, however, the Three Guards and Wu Geng rebelled against the regency of the Duke of Zhou. His victory led to the dissolution of Guan.

See also
 Three Guards Rebellion

11th century BC
States and territories disestablished in the 11th century BC
11th century BC in China
Ancient Chinese states
States and territories established in the 11th century BC